Semiconductor Research Corporation (SRC), commonly known as SRC, is a high-technology research consortium active in the semiconductor industry. It is a leading semiconductor research consortium. Todd Younkin is the incumbent president and chief executive officer of the company.

The consortium comprises more than twenty-five companies and government agencies with more than a hundred universities under contract performing research.

History 
SRC was founded in 1982 as a consortium to fund research by semiconductor companies.

In the past, it has funded university research projects in hardware and software co-design, new architectures, circuit design, transistors, memories, interconnects, and materials and has sponsored over 15,000 PhD students.

Research 
SRC has funded research in areas such as automotive, advanced memory technologies, logic and processing, advanced packaging, edge intelligence, and communications.

Programs

Joint University Microelectronics Program 
It is a long-term research program, in collaboration with DARPA and industry, that focuses on energy-efficient electronics, including actuation and sensing, signal processing, computing, and intelligent storage.

Global Research Collaboration Program 
It is an industry-led international research program with eight sub-topics including artificial intelligence hardware; analog mixed-signal circuits; computer-aided design and test; environment safety and health; hardware security; logic and memory devices; nanomanufacturing materials and processes; and packaging.

Undergraduate Research Program 
Undergraduate Research Program (URP) is a one-year academic program for students. The program combines an undergraduate research curriculum with industry experience. The program helps sustain a high retention rate of students who are interested in semiconductor research. It gives networking and job opportunities through an annual event.

Recognition 
In 2005, SRC received the National Medal of Technology and Innovation awarded by the president of the United States for their collaborative high-tech university research and for creating the concept and methodology, named International Technology Roadmap.

Awards 
 Semiconductor Research Corporation (SRC) Technical Excellence Awards

References 

Information technology companies of the United States
National Medal of Technology recipients
Semiconductor technology
1982 establishments in the United States